Swervo is a collaborative studio album by American rapper G Herbo and record producer Southside. It was released on July 27, 2018, by Machine Entertainment Group, Epic Records, Cinematic Music Group, 150 Dream Team and 808 Mafia. The production on the album was entirely handled by Southside, alongside Jake One and TM88, among others. The album also features guest appearances from 21 Savage, Chief Keef, Juice Wrld and Young Thug.

Swervo was supported by four singles: "Who Run It", "Focused", "Swervo" and "Some Nights".  The album received postivie reviews from music critics. It debuted at number 15 on the US Billboard 200 chart, earning 22,000 album-equivalent units in its first week. Its sequel album, Still Swervin, was released on February 1, 2019.

Background
On September 11, 2017, G Herbo was featured in an interview with XXL, in which he spoke about the project, he said:

The album's tracklist, cover art and release date was revealed on July 20, 2018. The announcement comes a month after G Herbo and Southside released the music video for the title track. G Herbo described Swervo as his "alter-ego" and the "opposite of G Herbo". He further commented on the project during an interview with Billboard detailing the concept of him "having fun and party records." In an interview with Complex, G Herbo talked about how the project came about, by saying:

Artwork
The album's artwork features G Herbo and Southside wearing custom-made jackets, sitting on a top of a white Rolls-Royce Ghost. It draws inspiration from Eric B. & Rakim's 1988 album Follow the Leader.

Singles
The album lead single, "Who Run It" was released on April 12, 2018. The second single, "Focused" featuring Southside was released on May 24, 2018. The third single, "Swervo" featuring Southside was released on June 21, 2018, accompanied by the JMP-directed music video. The fourth single, "Some Nights" was released on June 26, 2018.

Critical reception

Swervo was met with generally positive reviews. At Album of the Year, which assigns a normalized rating out of 100 to reviews from professional publications, the album received an average score of 74, based on three reviews.

Narsimha Chintaluri of HipHopDX stated that "G Herbo’s travels outside of Chicago and his comfort zone felt natural and necessary." "Unlike his debut, Herbo’s content on Swervo is more compartmentalized; a majority of the tracks here are strictly meant for the young man to vent and talk his CEO boss shit." In addition, Chintaluri stated that "Humble Beast presented a stark look at survivor’s guilt, Swervo mainly attempts to represent the flipside – leaving Herbo free to finally revel in success." Trevor Smith of HotNewHipHop stated that "the 22-year-old rapper only continues to grow. Really, there's no limit." Sheldon Pearce of Pitchfork stated that "He delivers some of his starkest verses like a steamroller, almost completely desensitized.  This daredevil approach to gunplay and cadences makes him seem unbreakable, but the longer the album goes on, the more it wears on you. Swervo is all velocity. He delivers high-powered, stampeding stanzas looking to bum-rush you before you even know what happened."

Commercial performance
Swero debuted at number 15 on the US Billboard 200 chart, earning 22,000 album-equivalent units (including 3,000 copies as pure album sales) in its first week. The album also accumulated a total of 25.4 million on-demand streams from the set's tracks that week.

Track listing
All tracks written by Herbert Wright III and Joshua Luellen, and produced by Southside, except where noted.

Notes
  signifies an uncredited co-producer

Sample credits
 "Who Run It (Remix)" contains a sample from "Who Run It", performed by Three 6 Mafia.

Personnel
Credits adapted from album's back cover.

Technical
 Max Lord – recording, mixing
 Tony Wilson – editing
 Slavic Livins – Mastering engineer (for Chicago Audio Mastering)

Additional personnel
 Oscar "YT Designs" Galvan – art direction, design
 TeeJay Spencer – art direction, design
 Rowdee "TheManBehindCovers" – art direction, design

Charts

References

2018 albums
G Herbo albums
Cinematic Music Group albums
Epic Records albums
Albums produced by Southside (record producer)
Albums produced by Cubeatz
Albums produced by Jake One
Albums produced by TM88